Shady Brook Farm is a historic home located at Marlboro, Ulster County, New York.  The house was originally built about 1850 in the Greek Revival style, and substantially enlarged and remodeled about 1917.  It consists of two two-story, gable-roofed blocks.  The front facade features a picturesque front porch with Gothic Revival style design elements. Also on the property are the contributing -story "South Cottage" (c. 1890) and a carriage barn (c. 1890).  After 1917, the main house was used as a summer boarding house until 1954.

It was listed on the National Register of Historic Places in 2012.

References

Houses on the National Register of Historic Places in New York (state)
Houses completed in 1850
Greek Revival houses in New York (state)
Gothic Revival architecture in New York (state)
Houses in Ulster County, New York
National Register of Historic Places in Ulster County, New York